Henry Clements  was an Irish politician.

Clements was born in County Cavan and educated at  Trinity College, Dublin. He represented  Cavan County from 1729 to 1745.

References

People from County Cavan
Irish MPs 1727–1760
Members of the Parliament of Ireland (pre-1801) for County Cavan constituencies
Alumni of Trinity College Dublin